The Ministry of Earth Sciences was formed on 29 January 2006 from a merger of the India Meteorological Department (IMD), the National Centre for Medium Range Weather Forecasting (NCMRWF), the Indian Institute of Tropical Meteorology, Pune (IITM), the Earth Risk Evaluation Centre (EREC), and the Ministry of Ocean Development.

History
In 1981; the Government of India created a Department of Ocean development (DoD) as a part of Cabinet Secretariat, which was kept directly under the charge of Prime Minister of India. In 1982 it became a separate department and it started carrying out its activities in the field of ocean development. In 2006; it was made a separate Ministry called Ministry of Ocean development. In July 2006 itself the Ministry was again reorganised and the new Ministry of Earth Sciences came into being with various institutions under its ambit. The Government via a resolution in 2006 brought Indian Metrological Department, Indian Institute of Tropical Meteorology and National centre for medium  range weather forecasting and research (NCMRWF) into its administrative control. The resolution also set up an Earth commission just like Atomic energy commission and Space commission. Currently, the ministry is headed by Dr Jitendra Singh.

Functions 
The Ministry's mandate is to look after Atmospheric Sciences, Ocean Science & Technology and Seismology in an integrated manner.

List of  Ministers

List of Ministers of State

Institutions under the Earth System Science Organisation
 National Centre for Coastal Research
 Indian Institute of Tropical Meteorology
 India Meteorological Department
 National Centre for Seismology
 Indian National Centre for Ocean Information Services
 National Centre for Medium Range Weather Forecasting
 National Centre for Polar and Ocean Research
 National Institute of Ocean Technology
 Earthquake Risk Evaluation Centre (under the Atmospheric Sciences and Seismology sector)
 Indian Tsunami Early Warning Centre
 Centre for Marine Living Resources & Ecology (under the Ocean Science & Technology sector)
 National Center for Earth System Sciences

Networking
All institutions under ESSO are connected through National Knowledge Network and its Common User Group (CUG).

Computation Facility
Adithya HPC located at Indian Institute of Tropical Meteorology is one of the largest computation facility in India.

See also
 Ministry of Science and Technology (India)

References

External links
 Official Ministry of Earth Sciences website
 Dod.nic.in: Ministry of Earth Sciences
 National Centre for Coastal Research (NCCR)
 National Institute of Ocean Technology (NIOT)
 Indian National Centre for Ocean Information Services (INCOIS)
 National Centre for Antarctic & Ocean Research (NCAOR)
 Centre for Marine Living Resources & Ecology (CMLRE)
 National Centre for Medium Range Weather Forecasting (NCMRWF)
 India Meteorological Department (IMD)
 Indian Institute of Tropical Meteorology (IITM)

 
Earth Sciences
India, Earth Sciences
Earth sciences organizations
Science and technology in India